Raymond Leo Flynn (born July 22, 1939) is an American politician who served as the mayor of Boston, Massachusetts, from 1984 until 1993. He also served as United States Ambassador to the Holy See from 1993 to 1997.

Flynn was an All-American college basketball player at Providence College.  During his senior year, Flynn was selected the "Most Valuable Player" in the 1963 National Invitation Tournament. After a brief professional basketball career, Flynn worked in a several fields, including as a high school teacher and a probation officer, before entering politics. Flynn began his political career as a Democratic member of the Massachusetts House of Representatives from 1971 to 1979, representing the South Boston neighborhood during the turbulent Boston desegregation busing crisis of the early 1970s. Flynn opposed federally-mandated school busing. Throughout his political career, Flynn held a strong anti-abortion position. As a state legislator, Flynn co-authored the "Flynn–Doyle amendment" that would have banned government-funding of abortions covered by Medicaid. This was vetoed by Governor Michael Dukakis. Flynn later served on the Boston City Council from 1978 to 1984.

Flynn successfully ran for mayor of Boston in 1983 and took office in 1984. Flynn was reelected in 1987 and 1991. Polls showed Flynn to enjoy strong approval from Bostonians during his mayoralty. As mayor, Flynn balanced the city's budget, eliminating a large budget deficit. To address the deficit, Flynn lobbied heavily for the passage of a revenue package for the city in the Massachusetts Legislature to provide additional state aid to the city and the authorization for the city to raise new local taxes. In 1985, a revenue package was passed and  signed into law by Governor Michael Duakakis. In response to discriminatory practices studies found banks to be practicing in Boston, Flynn took actions which persuaded banks to reach a $400 million community reinvestment agreement with the city. Flynn succeeded in getting legislation passed to replace the city's publicly-elected school board with the new Boston School Committee, members of which are appointed by the city's mayor. Flynn would quickly come to express his regret about this change. In 1990, Flynn saw strong criticism from Black leaders over the Boston Police Department's handling of the investigation into the murder of Carol Stuart. As mayor, Flynn advanced plans to desegregate the city's public housing. Flynn's administration gave neighborhood groups more of a voice in the use of the city's development and planning authorities in their neighborhoods. This included innovative move of granting the Dudley Street Neighborhood Initiative powers of eminent domain. Flynn successfully fought to enact rent control laws and strong tenants' rights laws. Flynn also served as president of the United States Conference of Mayors from 1991 to 1992.

Flynn resigned as mayor in 1993 in order to accept an appointment by President Bill Clinton as ambassador to the Holy See. He expanded the position's mission to involve participation in addressing problem areas around the world. During his tenure as ambassador, he also encountered some controversy. In 1998, Flynn unsuccessfully ran for the United States House of Representatives. Flynn later served as president of Catholic Alliance, a nonpartisan Catholic advocacy group.

Early life and education
Flynn grew up in South Boston, where he has spent most of his life living. Flynn is Irish-American. His father was a union longshoreman, and his mother was a cleaning lady. Flynn grew up a member of the Gate of Haven Parish in South Boston.

Flynn was a three-sport star athlete at South Boston High School.

Flynn attended Providence College on a basketball sports scholarship. Flynn was an All-American college basketball player at Providence College, and during his senior year was selected as the "Most Valuable Player" in the 1963 National Invitation Tournament (NIT).

Later in life, while a Boston city councilor, Flynn would receive a master’s degree in education from Harvard University.

Professional basketball career and early career
In April 1963, he was selected by the Syracuse Nationals in the fourth round of the NBA draft. The Nationals relocated to Philadelphia to become the 76ers, but Flynn did not play for them, as he spent part of the 1963–64 season with the Wilmington Blue Bombers of the Eastern Professional Basketball League. Philadelphia traded his NBA rights to the Boston Celtics in September 1964, and in October he was the last player cut from the Celtics roster.

Before his political career, Flynn worked as a youth worker, high school teacher, and a probation officer.

Massachusetts House of Representatives (1971–1978)
Monopolizing off of his local sports hero celebrity, Flynn won election to the Massachusetts House of Representatives in November 1970. As a state representative, Flynn was generally representative of the views of his South Boston district’s constituency., He was pro-trade unions, for affordable housing and tenants rights, opposed redlining, opposed expansion at Logan Airport, and opposed cutting welfare programs. He was also a supporter of providing more state funding to special needs students in schools. Peter Dreier would later describe his positions as a state representative as having, largely, been a, "parochial South Boston pol with progressive leanings."

Flynn was an opponent of court ordered desegregation busing. In 1973, he worked against implementing the city of Boston’s desegregation school busing plan even filing a lawsuit against the Massachusetts Board of Education over the matter. Flynn argued that desegregation busing would pit poor Black and poor White families against one another within a second-tier school system, all while wealthy suburbanites sent their students to well-funded schools. Flynn refused to the militant anti-busers, Louise Day Hicks and William Bulger when they released a statement of resistance that was seen as having racist overtones. Flynn urged against violent actions that were being taken by some in protest of busing. As a result of his refusal to join the more militant factions of resistance to busing, Flynn alienated himself from the more extremist factions of his community. His car was firebombed, and his family received death threats by telephone calls.

In 1974, Flynn filed legislation to repeal a state law which required that children attend school. He would claim this had been a mistake during his 1983 mayoral campaign.

In March 1975, he announced himself as a candidate for the 1975 Boston mayoral election. However, he withdrew in June after struggling to fundraise, and instead launched his candidacy for the Boston City Council. He would lose his race for city council that November, falling a mere 1,467 votes shy of election.

Flynn co-authored a bill to end government-funding of abortions covered by Medicaid. The "Flynn-Doyle amendment", co-authored with State Representative Charles R. Doyle, was passed by the state legislature, but successfully vetoed by Governor Michael Dukakis. Flynn and Doyle then, later that year, attached the bill as a rider to a state pay-raise bill, which was passed by the Massachusetts State Legislature, but this was again vetoed by Dukakis. The amendment would be successfully passed over Dukakis' veto in 1978, after Flynn had already left the leislature to serve on the Boston City Council.

Boston City Council (1978–1984)
Flynn was elected to the Boston City Council in November 1977. Flynn would be reelected in 1979 and 1981. In 1981, Flynn was the top vote-getter by a large margin.

Peter Dreier would later describe Flynn as having transitioned as a city councilor, "from a parochial neighborhood politician with progressive leanings to a crusader with citywide appeal." while on the Boston City Council. Drier would describe Flynn as having been an, "18-hour-a-day workaholic," and the, “hardest working City Councilor". He had a reputation for regularly attending public meetings. South Boston, which Flynn represented, was regarded to be relatively politically conservative.

As a city councilor, Flynn opposed rate increases by utility companies. He was viewed as an ally of trade unions, welfare recipients, and working women. Flynn regularly proposed tenants' rights bills on the Boston City Council, which were defeated. Flynn believed that his city council colleagues were influenced by sizable donations from the real estate lobby, especially faulting the Greater Boston Real Estate Board. In 1983, Dudley Clendinen of The New York Times wrote of Flynn’s politics, 

In October 1979, Flynn, together with Joseph F. Timilty, rescued a Black man from an encounter with a White mob on the Boston Common.

1983 mayoral campaign

In April 1983, Flynn announced his candidacy for mayor of Boston. In the October nonpartisan primary election, Flynn and State Representative Mel King placed atop the results, advancing to the general election. King was the first African American to be a candidate in a Boston mayoral general election. Both Flynn and King had originally been viewed as underdogs in the primary election. Flynn defeated King in the general election.

Flynn's campaign received no real financial support from major sectors of the city's business community. Flynn outright refused to accept campaign donations from developers with projects pending before city agencies, or lawyers of such developers. Both the Flynn and King campaigns had low-expenditures compared to the nearly $2 million campaign that outgoing mayor Kevin White and the political machine supporting him had spent on his candidacies in the 1975 and 1979 mayoral elections. Flynn's campaign spend roughly $400,000, while King's spent less than $350,000.

Dudly Clendinen wrote that Flynn had worked to establish himself as a champion of the poor and elderly and to appeal across ethnic lines to ethnic minority voters.

Primary election
Flynn first announced his candidacy in front of a public housing project, pledging that he would be a "people's mayor". He was viewed as an underdog at the start of his campaign, due to a lack of funding, a political organization, or connections to the business or media establishments.

Flynn and King had both shaped the narrative of the debate during the hotly-contested primary, successfully creating a "downtown versus the neighborhoods" narrative, with Flynn and King taking the side of being in support of the city's neighborhoods. A major item of debate was linkage, a fee that would be placed on downtown developers to raise funds for affordable housing. Flynn and King placed in the primary above candidates who were perceived as more representative of "downtown" interests. Coinciding with the primary, voters also strongly approved non-binding referendums in favor of a linkage policy and the creation of neighborhood councils. Both referendums had been supported by the group Massachusetts Fair Share.

During the primary, the city's progressive activists were largely sharply divided between Flynn and King's candidacies. Flynn benefited from grassroots support.

General election
In the general election, Flynn received the political endorsement of "The Boston Globe" editorial board. Among the groups endorsing Flynn were low-income tenant organizations, elderly organizations, and a number of labor unions.

In the election, both Flynn and King worked to build progressive coalitions, and both pledge to dedicate themselves to working across ethnic divides in the city. In the five weeks leading up to the general election, the two candidates held more than fifty local neighborhood debates.

The campaign was peaceful, and only a handful of isolated racial violence incidents occurred during it.

Mayoralty (1984–1993)

Flynn served as mayor from his inauguration on January 2, 1984 until his resignation on July 12, 1993. During his tenure, Flynn was regarded to be a popular mayor, which was reflected in high approval ratings. As mayor, Flynn maintained a prominent public profile.

General politics

Reelection campaigns

Flynn was reelected mayor in 1987 and 1991, winning more than two-thirds of the vote each time. In his reelections, he won a higher vote share in Black and Hispanic areas of the city than he did in White areas.

In 1987, Flynn carried every ward of the city, except his native South Boston (perhaps due to his promise, weeks before the election, to desegregate all-white Boston Housing Authority developments in South Boston).

Flynn's 1991 campaign for a third term came despite of his 1981 campaign promise to only serve two terms. In his 1991 campaign, he ran a low-profile campaign that he touted as being "grassroots", and ran no television or radio advertisements. He centered his candidacy on ties to the city's neighborhoods and his successes in balancing the city's budget.

State and national politics

Flynn was an outspoken critic of the cuts that President Ronald Reagan championed making to federal revenue sharing, urban development grants, and housing and job assistance programs.

Flynn considered running in the 1990 Massachusetts gubernatorial election, but due to police controversies, his struggling relationship with the minority community, and his  anti-abortion stance, he ruled out a run.

Flynn became a national leader on urban matters. In 1987, as chair of the United States Conference of Mayors’ Task Force on Hunger and Homelessness, Flynn advocated for the passage of the McKinney–Vento Homeless Assistance Act. Flynn served as president of the United States Conference of Mayors during 1991–92. In this role, Flynn challenged the theories of some pundits that cities were becoming economically obsolete due to the rise of "edge city" suburbanization, by arguing that, "as cities go, so goes America".

Ahead of the 1992 United States presidential election, there was some talk about whether Flynn could be a prospective vice presidential runningmate on a Democratic ticket. In February 1992, Flynn unsuccessfully urged New York Governor Mario Cuomo to run in the presidential election. It took Flynn a while to grow warm to the Democratic Party's ultimate presidential nominee, Bill Clinton. He endorsed Clinton in late June 1992. Flynn, a lifelong anti-abortion activist, played a role in drawing the pro-life Catholic vote to pro-abortion rights Bill Clinton in the general election. Flynn physically campaigned on Clinton’s behalf in roughly half of the nation’s states.

Economic matters

Community reinvestment agreement with banks
In 1989, two studies (including one by the Boston Redevelopment Authority) found the city's major banks to be discriminating in their mortgage lending, hiring, and branch location practices. In collaboration with community activists, Flynn raised a more than year-long campaign to pressure banks to change their practices. He also announced a plan to issue a regular city-sponsored "report card" on bank practices, and a "linked deposit" policy to have the city then withdraw funds from banks that received poor track records on these "report card" and to expand its deposits in banks which instead worked to meet the needs of the city's neighborhoods. As a consequence, the banks reached a $400 million community reinvestment agreement with the city, in which the banks promised to open new branches, change lending and hiring practices, and to collaborate more closely with CDCs and community groups.

Fiscal matters
When Flynn took office, the city had a $40 million deficit. Flynn was able to balance the city's budget each year he was in office and improved the fiscal controls of the city. Flynn was able to improve the city's bond rating each year he was in office. When he left office, the city had its highest bond rating in its history.

In his first term as mayor, Flynn dealt with a drastic cut in federal funds allocated to Boston.

During his mayoralty, Boston divested from corporations that invested in Northern Ireland and Apartheid South Africa.

Revenue package

To address the city's deficit, upon taking office, Flynn worked to receive additional state aid and state legislature authorization to raise new local taxes. The state, at the time, viewed the city government as wasteful and inefficient. Flynn needed the help of the city's business community to convince the state. Particularly the business community's watchdog group, the Boston Municipal Research Bureau. In order to convince the business community that the Flynn administration was going to spend new revenues in a cost-effective manner, he recruited business community members to top positions in the municipal budget and treasury departments, and also created an advisory committee on management and budget operations that featured representatives from the business community. Flynn heeded the advise of this advisory committee, and "opened the books" on the city fiscal situation, something his predecessor, Kevin White, had refused to do himself. Ultimately, the Municipal Research Bureau gave its approval to Flynn's revenue package and lobbied for it.

Flynn also met across the state with individuals and groups such as local official's, business groups, and trade unions in order to persuade them to lobby their own legislators to support the state legislation he was seeking. Flynn made the argument that Boston's economic and fiscal health was critical to that of all of Massachusetts. He characterized Boston as being a generator of jobs and state sales tax revenue, as well as the home to institutions which  benefited the entire state.

In 1984, the initial revenue package that Flynn championed was defeated in the state legislature. In 1985, Flynn proposed and lobbied for a revised revenue package. This revenue package passed, and was signed into law by Governor Dukakis.

Labor matters
Flynn created the "Boston jobs" program, requiring that developers that obtained city permits to hire Boston residents for half of all their construction jobs, minorities for one quarter of all their construction jobs, and  women for one-tenth of all their construction jobs.

When Boston hotel owners and Hotel Employees and Restaurant Employees Union Local 26 were in conflict, and looked poised for a long and tense strike in 1985, Flynn had his police chief privately inform hotel owners that they could not count on the Boston Police Department to protect strikebreakers or preserve order outside and within hotel establishments. This private action of Flynn helped weaken the resolve of the hotel owners, who settled with Local 26, netting the union a significant victory.

When Flynn traveled to southwestern Virginia  to support coal mining households during the Pittston Coal strike against the Pittston Coal Group, he learned from United Mine Workers President Richard Trumka that William Craig, a member of Pittston's board, was also vice chairman of Shawmut Bank, the city of Boston's second largest lender. Upon returning to the city, Flynn threaten that Boston would withdraw its deposits from the bank unless Craig resigned from the board of Pittston.

Education

In 1989, Flynn spearheaded the creation of a policy which requires that new commercial developments in the city's downtown provide childcare services on-site or otherwise fund resources for off-site childcare spaces. However, the policy would, for decades, prove difficult to enforce due to the fact that the policy did not previous provide a clear definition of the amounts that developers needed to pay for off-site childcare spaces. This was addressed in 2022, when Mayor Michelle Wu signed an executive order outlining a formula to determine the amount of these payments.

In July 1991, Flynn won a fight to turn Boston School Committee from an elected school board to one whose members are appointed by the mayor. This change took effect in January 1992. Before this change, the elected school board had come to be regarded as fractious.

As he approached his departure as mayor in 1993, Flynn questioned whether the change had been a good decision. He conceded that it had disenfranchised the input of voters in shaping the school board, and had upset many communities of color in the city. In 1993, little over a year since the appointed board had taken office, disorder had already arisen on the board, and Black organizers in the city were pushing to revert to an elected school board. In July 1993, Flynn remarked, 

Flynn also conceded that the appointed school board had failed in terms of accountability, remarking in 1993, 

In 1993, Flynn wrote an open letter to those seeking to run in the 1993 Boston mayoral election to succeed him which pronounced his regret for having changed the city's school board to an appointed board, and which expressed his preference for reverting it back to an elected one. This was to no avail, and Boston remains the only municipality in Massachusetts without an elected school board.

Public safety and law enforcement

In 1985, Flynn appointed Francis Roache as the city's police commissioner. Roache was as childhood friend of Flynn, and would be one of his closet associates during his mayoralty.

Flynn's administration funded neighborhood watch groups.

In 1990, Flynn was placed under strong criticism from Black leaders over the police’s handling of the investigation into the murder of Carol Stuart, including the arrest  and intensive search of William Bennett.

In response to concerns over the police department (including those stemming from the investigation into Carol Stuart's murder), in May 1991, Flynn empaneled the St. Clair Commission, headed by James D. St. Clair. In January 1992, the St. Clair Commission released its report, which was critical of the Boston Police Department for mismanagement, and urged against reappointing Commissioner Roache when his term expired that April. Flynn appointed William Bratton the city’s new police commissioner.

Urban development

Flynn took office amid a period of urban flight by the city's middle class. Peter Dreier would describe Flynn as having been elected "with a populist mandate to 'share the prosperity' of Boston's downtown economic boom—particularly in terms of jobs and housing—with the city's poor and working-class residents. Flynn had campaigned for office in his initial election on a housing-focused platform.

When Flynn assumed office, the federal government was greatly decreasing federal funding for urban housing, job training, and economic development programs. Boston had been reliant on federal funding  for these uses for the preceding quarter-century. Flynn looked to the private sector. He worked to use public-private partnerships as well as government regulatory tools of the private sector such as zoning and rent control. Flynn was successful in his fight to implement rent control laws in the city.

During Flynn's mayoralty, the city had a strong development market.

During Flynn's mayoralty, the City of Boston regained control over the Boston Housing Authority, which had previously been in court receivership. Weeks before the 1987 mayoral election, Flynn publicized a plan to desegregate all-white housing developments of the Boston Housing Authority located in South Boston. In 1988, the city of Boston reached a formal agreement with the federal government to integrate public housing in South Boston.

The Flynn administration provided neighborhood groups with a strong voice in planning and development, as well as other decisions, through neighborhood councils, zoning committees, and project-specific advisory groups.

During Flynn's mayoralty, major projects included the new Boston City Hospital complex. The city also created what was its first long-term capital plan for fixing its streets, infrastructure, school structures, and for creating new precinct stations and recreation centers. The city also significantly improved its parks and recreation centers.

Flynn focused on addressing the quality of life in neighborhoods, as well as on addressing gentrification.

The city built what was an unprecedented number of new units of affordable housing during Flynn's mayoralty. Flynn's administration successfully overcame the political forces of the city's real estate industry to put in place a policy that doubled the linkage fee funds that downtown developers were required to provide to neighborhood housing funds. Over the course of his mayoralty, this fund received over $70 million, and helped in the city's creation of over 8,000 units of affordable housing.

After a five-year campaign by Flynn and community activists, United States Secretary of Housing and Urban Development Samuel Pierce agreed to hand over to community-based non profits and tenant organizations a total of 2,000 HUD-subsidized apartments located in roughly 70 buildings that had been abandoned by their owners. Later on, Clinton HUD Secretary Henry Cisneros decided to change HUD policy to replicate the success Boston ultimately had in turning around troubled HUD projects.

Flynn successful fights to enact rent control laws and strong tenants' rights laws, which put him at odds with the landlord lobby. The Flynn administration also funded tenant groups, who organized against bad landlords. In 1986, Flynn worked successfully with tenant activists to get the Boston City Council to pass a ban on developers evicting tenants in order to clear apartment buildings for condominium conversions. In 1988, he worked to successfully get the City Council to empower the city's rent board with regulatory powers over condo conversions and lodging houses. Flynn also got the City Council to put in place rent control on projects in the city subsidized by United States Department of Housing and Urban Development if the owners exercised the option to prepay their federally subsidized mortgages. These movies potentially protected thousands of subsidized units in the city from conversion to market-rate housing.

Flynn also championed inclusionary housing policies that would require developers of market-rate housing to provide units for moderate and low-income residents. In July 1986, Flynn presented the Boston Redevelopment Authority with a potential policy to require private developers to designate 10% of their housing units in projects with at least ten units for moderate and low-income residents. This push faced strong opposition.

Boston's development director Steve Coyle oversaw the institution of controversial "downzoning" safeguards aimed at combatting the "Manhattanization" of the city's historic downtown and neighborhoods.

Flynn's administration collaborated on development with nonprofit organizations. They worked with community development corporations to undertake the rehabilitation of thousands of housing units in the city. A very notable example of collaboration saw the city government delegate its own urban renewal powers (including eminent domain authority) to the Dudley Street Neighborhood Initiative, a community group in the Roxbury neighborhood, who are allowed to use that authority in parts of the neighborhood.

Resignation and succession

In 1993, Flynn resigned during his third term as mayor when he was appointed by Clinton to serve as United States Ambassador to the Holy See (the Vatican). Flynn was nominated in March 1993, and announced he would be resigning as mayor. However, in June, he reconsidered whether he would accept the role. He met with President Clinton and United States State Department officials to better define what his role would be as ambassador. The Senate unanimously confirmed his nomination that month, and he resigned as mayor on July 12, 1993.

Upon the announcement of Flynn's nomination, it became anticipated that then-Boston City Council President Thomas Menino was, per the city charter, going to assume the office of "acting mayor" upon Flynn's expected resignation. Flynn had had a longtime friendship with Menino. However, their relationship was noted to have become somewhat terser during the period in which Flynn was preparing to hand over the office to Menino. One cause for their rift was that, after Menino had promised he would appoint 100 new police officers when he took office, Flynn beat him to the chase and did so himself, which angered Menino.

When Flynn resigned on June 12, 1993, Menino became acting mayor. Menino would go on to win the 1993 Boston mayoral election, becoming mayor.

Ambassador to the Holy See (1993–1997)
Flynn served as Ambassador Extraordinary and Plenipotentiary to the Holy See from September 2, 1993, through September 20, 1997. He was the first member of the Democratic Party to hold this post.

Clinton had Flynn expand the role of the post's mission. Flynn not only represented the United States to the Holy See, but also represented the United States' in imperiled areas around the world on matters of social justice and economic justice. Flynn helped lead relief efforts related to an earthquake in India, and was involved in humanitarian aid efforts to nations such as Bosnia and Herzegovina, Haiti, Kenya, Somalia, Sudan, and Uganda. He was also involved in efforts to broker the Good Friday Agreement. He also collaborated with the Holy See on efforts to resolve problems in various areas of the world. He also played a key role in brokering an agreement to start a formal process to have Israel and the Holy See establish formal relations with each other. Flynn's tenure was somewhat shaky, however. He twice received reprimands from the United States Department of State. One instance was for emphatically discussing domestic American policy, the other instance was for having an employee of the embassy manage Flynn's family's finances.

Shortly after his resignation, on October 3, 1997, The Boston Globe published an article which both accused Flynn of having been a sub-par diplomat as ambassador and of having had a longtime drinking problem. Flynn accused the newspaper of attacking him both because, he alleged, the paper opposed his planned 1998 gubernatorial campaign. Flynn also he alleged that the newspaper held contempt for his "class, religion and ethnic background." This article was seen as hurting Flynn's public image.

1998 congressional campaign
Following his service as ambassador, Flynn considered running for governor of Massachusetts in 1998. However, obstacles, such as a lack of financial campaign reserves and the political challenge of running for governor in the state with his strong anti-abortion stance, dissuaded him. Instead, Flynn ran unsuccessfully for Massachusetts's 8th congressional district seat that was being vacated by Joseph P. Kennedy II in 1998. Flynn formally announced his candidacy in June, and in September lost in the Democratic primary election, the real contest in this heavily Democratic district, to Somerville mayor general election winner Mike Capuano, placing second with roughly 18% of the vote. Flynn had been an early front-runner in the primary. However, Capuano won, with polls showing Capuano to have enjoyed a last-minute rise in support.

Flynn was the only anti-abortion candidate of the ten running in the primary, and his campaign advertising utilized photos of him with Pope John Paul II and Mother Teresa. Flynn had run a quiet grassroots campaign operation.

Ceci Connolly of The Washington Post observed during the campaign,

Later politics

During the general election campaign of the 2009 Boston mayoral election, Flynn and his one-time mayoral opponent Mel King both came together to endorse Michael Flaherty's campaign against Thomas Menino.

In 2010, Flynn crossed party lines to vote for the successful candidacy of Republican nominee Scott Brown for the United States Senate. In 2012, Flynn appeared in television ads supporting Brown for reelection. Flynn also voiced support for Mitt Romney, the Republican nominee for president.

Media career
In 1998, Flynn had a role as a radio host on WRKO in Boston. In September 2014, Flynn became a regular contributor to The Pilot, the official newspaper of the Roman Catholic Archdiocese of Boston. In February 2017, Flynn became a columnist for the Boston Herald.

Religious advocacy

In 1999, Flynn became president of Catholic Alliance, a nonpartisan Catholic advocacy group. In this role, while remaining a Democrat, he and the Catholic Alliance endorsed George W. Bush in the 2000 presidential election. Flynn also became president of another Catholic political advocacy organization, Your Catholic Voice. He later started Catholic Citizenship, serving as its national chairman from 2004 until 2008. Since 2004, Flynn has also served on the advisory board of Catholics for the Common Good, a lay apostolate for evangelization of culture.

Personal life

Flynn is married to Catherine (née Coyne), who often goes by "Kathy" . They have six children: Ray Jr., Eddie, Julie, Nancy, Katie, and Maureen. In November 2017, son Edward M. Flynn was elected to the Boston City Council.

While serving as mayor, Flynn played himself in the 1989 Cheers episode "The Stork Brings A Crane". In the episode, Flynn has his entourage take away Cliff Clavin, who writes Flynn once a week.

Flynn was an avid runner who made headlines when he ran in the Boston Marathon and the New York City Marathon in 1984.

In March 2007, Flynn was grand marshal of the 246th New York St. Patrick's Day Parade.

In May 2007, Flynn joined the College of Fellows of the Dominican School of Philosophy and Theology in Berkeley, California, who also awarded him the honorary degree Doctor of Humane Letters.

In September 2008, Flynn was hospitalized after he collapsed at a Boston-area speaking engagement. In March 2011, Flynn's home was broken into; among the valuables taken were rosary beads blessed by Pope John Paul II and letters from influential world figures. In December 2021, Flynn broke was hospitalized after falling and breaking a bone in his neck.

Flynn has continued residing in South Boston.

Honors
In February 2016, the Boston Marine Industrial Park was renamed the Raymond L. Flynn Marine Park. A nearby bridge was also renamed in Flynn's honor. In May 2017, Governor of Massachusetts Charlie Baker dedicated Flynn Cruiseport Boston, located in the Port of Boston.

Flynn has received a number of civic awards. He has received the B'nai B'rith International Humanitarian Award, Martin Luther King Jr. Award, and Boys Club of America "Man of the Year Award". In 2019, the business interest organization A Better City awarded Flynn a "Lifetime Achievement" award. Then-mayor Marty Walsh presented the award to Flynn at an awards ceremony. Walsh praised Flynn, declaring tat Flynn had, "led at the national and international level, while always staying closely connected to the people in our working class neighborhoods. He’s always been a champion for everyday people: working men and women; kids and seniors; people with disabilities; and everyone who calls the city of Boston their home."

Electoral history

State Representative
1970

1972

1974

1976

City Council

Mayoral

Congressional

Bibliography
Flynn is the co-author of two books:

See also
 1971–1972 Massachusetts legislature
 1973–1974 Massachusetts legislature
 1974–1975 Massachusetts legislature
 1975–1976 Massachusetts legislature
 1977–1978 Massachusetts legislature
 Timeline of Boston, 1980s–1990s

References

External links 

 
 Guide to the Mayor Raymond L. Flynn records at cityofboston.gov
 Ray Flynn biography at the Dominican School of Philosophy and Theology

1939 births
American male biographers
20th-century American novelists
Living people
Massachusetts city council members
Mayors of Boston
Democratic Party members of the Massachusetts House of Representatives
Providence Friars men's basketball players
Roman Catholic activists
Ambassadors of the United States to the Holy See
Syracuse Nationals draft picks
Novelists from Massachusetts
Knights Grand Cross of the Order of Pope Pius IX
Harvard Graduate School of Education alumni
American anti-abortion activists
20th-century American biographers
American male novelists
People from South Boston
Catholics from Massachusetts
Presidents of the United States Conference of Mayors
American men's basketball players
20th-century American male writers
20th-century American diplomats
20th-century American politicians